Vereya is a town in Naro-Fominsky District of Moscow Oblast, Russia, located on the right bank of the Protva River  southwest of Moscow. Population:    6,500 (1969).

History
It was first mentioned in a chronicle in 1371. During the following century, Vereya was the seat of the tiny Vereya Principality, ruled by a lateral branch of the Muscovite Rurikids. The last prince of Vereya was married to Sophia Palaiologina's Greek niece. He escaped to the Grand Duchy of Lithuania and married his daughter Sophia to Stanislovas Goštautas.

Administrative and municipal status
Within the framework of administrative divisions, it is, together with nineteen rural localities, incorporated within Naro-Fominsky District as the Town of Vereya. As a municipal division, the Town of Vereya is incorporated within Naro-Fominsky Municipal District as Vereya Urban Settlement.

Architecture
The Nativity Cathedral in the local kremlin was commissioned by Vladimir of Staritsa to commemorate the conquest of Kazan in 1552. It was extensively rebuilt at the turn of the 18th century; a lofty Neoclassical belltower was erected in 1802. The oldest parish church goes back to 1667-1679.

Sports
The town has a rugby league team, the Vereya Bears, who play in the Russian Championship.

References

Notes

Sources

Cities and towns in Moscow Oblast
Vereysky Uyezd